The Europe Zone was one of the three regional zones of the 1968 Davis Cup.

32 teams entered the Europe Zone, competing across 2 sub-zones. The winners of each sub-zone went on to compete in the Inter-Zonal Zone against the winners of the Americas Zone and Eastern Zone.

Spain defeated Italy in the Zone A final, and West Germany defeated South Africa in the Zone B final, resulting in both Spain and West Germany progressing to the Inter-Zonal Zone.

Zone A

Draw

First round

Spain vs. Netherlands

Sweden vs. Rhodesia

Great Britain vs. France

Finland vs. Portugal

Soviet Union vs. Greece

Yugoslavia vs. New Zealand

Italy vs. Hungary

Monaco vs. Ireland

Quarterfinals

Spain vs. Sweden

Great Britain vs. Finland

Soviet Union vs. Yugoslavia

Italy vs. Monaco

Semifinals

Spain vs. Great Britain

Italy vs. Soviet Union

Final

Spain vs. Italy

Zone B

Draw

First round

Bulgaria vs. Turkey

West Germany vs. Switzerland

Belgium vs. Poland

Czechoslovakia vs. Brazil

Luxembourg vs. Norway

Romania vs. Denmark

Iran vs. Israel

Austria vs. South Africa

Quarterfinals

Bulgaria vs. West Germany

Belgium vs. Czechoslovakia

Norway vs. Romania

Iran vs. South Africa

Semifinals

West Germany vs. Czechoslovakia

Final

West Germany vs. South Africa

References

External links
Davis Cup official website

Davis Cup Europe/Africa Zone
Europe Zone
Davis Cup